Stasys Šačkus (September 9, 1907 – November 9, 1985) was a Lithuanian athlete and basketball player.

Biography
In 1928, he graduated Marijampolė Gymnasium. Later studied humanities studies at Vytautas Magnus University. Stasys actively participated in sport, academic and political life.

In 1934, he graduated Department of Physical Education Academy in Berlin.

During occupation of Lithuania by Nazi Germany, he was member of Lithuanian Activist Front, participated in June Uprising. He also was member of Lithuanian Freedom Army. On October 18, 1945, he was exiled to Siberia by Soviet authorities and imprisoned in Vorkuta Gulag. He later returned to Lithuania.

Sporting activities
During his years in gymnasium, he became one of the best Lithuanian athlete. Before World War II, he accomplished pentathlon, pole vault and 110 meter hurdling records. Šačkus is the most famous for his discus throwing. He is the first to overcome 40 meter point with his 44-meter result.

He participated in various athletics competitions in Berlin, London, New York City, Tallinn, Riga. He was the first Lithuanian sportsman to participate in the first athletics competition - 1934 European Athletics Championships in Turin, Italy.

In addition, Šačkus also was Lithuania national basketball team player, won EuroBasket gold medals for the first time in Lithuania history during EuroBasket 1937. He also won two gold medals in Lithuanian National Olympic Games. In 1939, he was the first Lithuanian to be awarded international category basketball referee name.

Later he was Republic Basketball Committee chairman, gymnastics federation (LGSF) sports club "Vaidotas" member, LGSF football team manager. He was awarded honored coach name.

Sources
 Vidas Mačiulis, Vytautas Gudelis. Halė, kurioje žaidė Lubinas ir Sabonis. 1939–1989 – Respublikinis sporto kombinatas, Kaunas, 1989

1907 births
1985 deaths
FIBA EuroBasket-winning players
Lithuanian men's basketball players
Gulag detainees